Chuck Tingle is a pseudonymous author, primarily of niche gay erotica. The stories mainly take the form of monster erotica, featuring romantic and sexual encounters with dinosaurs, imaginary creatures, anthropomorphized inanimate objects, and even abstract concepts. He self-publishes his works through Amazon, primarily as ebooks, but also as paperbacks and audiobooks. In 2016, his short story Space Raptor Butt Invasion was a finalist for the Hugo Awards, the result of a coordinated campaign which he disavowed.  The following year he was a finalist for the Hugo for Best Fan Writer.

Personal life 
Little has been confirmed about Tingle's identity, beyond the fact that the name "Chuck Tingle" is a pseudonym. He claims to have been born in Home of Truth, Utah, a small isolated southern Utah ghost town established in 1933 as a religious commune and abandoned in 1977. He has described himself as bisexual.

Tingle presents himself as a taekwondo grandmaster from Billings, Montana, who acquired a PhD in holistic massage at DeVry University (which does not offer such a degree). A photo presented as a portrait of Tingle was found on a stock photo web site.

In 2016, a person presenting as Tingle's son Jon stated in a Reddit "Ask Me Anything" session that he edits his father's work for publication and provides day-to-day care for him. Jon stated that Tingle is an autistic savant, as well as a variety of other claims about Tingle that have remained unconfirmed or denied by Tingle himself. However, Tingle's Facebook account and website confirmed that Jon is his son and that Tingle has Asperger syndrome. Tingle has said that his wife drowned in an automobile accident, but Jon stated that his parents are divorced, and the woman who died was Tingle's caregiver. Tingle has a distinctive style of conversation, such as consistently referring to Jon as "son name of Jon" and his fans as "buckaroos" and "ladybucks", but this does not carry over to his published fiction. Tingle claims this is for privacy reasons.

Career 
Tingle began self-publishing erotic fiction through Amazon's ebook service in 2014, with the titles My Billionaire Triceratops Craves Gay Ass, Pounded by President Bigfoot, and Taken by the Gay Unicorn Biker. His work includes erotic encounters with personifications of inanimate objects, such as I'm Gay for My Living Billionaire Jet Plane and Creamed in the Butt by My Handsome Living Corn. Other titles feature abstract concepts as sexual partners or involve metatextual references, such as Angry Man Pounded by the Fear of His Latent Gayness over a Dinosaur Transitioning into a Unicorn, Slammed in the Butt by My Hugo Award Nomination, and Pounded in the Butt by My Book "Pounded in the Butt by My Book 'Pounded in the Butt by My Book "Pounded in the Butt by My Own Butt (referring to a series of previous publications). Tingle often incorporates current news stories or public figures into his titles, using sound-alike or look-alike names, such as Domald Tromp's Ass is Haunted by the Handsome Ghost of His Incriminating Tax Returns and Billionaire Elons Mugg Takes the Handsome Planet Mars in his Butt.

Tingle refers to his stories as "Tinglers". Although they typically feature apparently cisgender male couples, stories also feature bisexual, lesbian, and trans characters. Tingle stresses the consensuality of the encounters, and the stories end happily with "an optimistic, philosophical moral about love and togetherness". The person presented as Tingle's son Jon stated that the anthropomorphism in many stories reflects "identity issues that he has been working through his whole life", which have manifested as him "'becoming' other people or things."

Tingle says he uses Photoshop software to create his own book covers, which usually feature a photo of a muscular, bare-chested man juxtaposed with an image of the entity whose sexual escapades are featured in the story.

In 2019, Tingle was one of the special guests featured on YouTuber Hbomberguy's charity livestream for the UK trans children's support group Mermaids. A few days later, Tingle published a book titled Pounded in the Butt By the Handsome Sentient Manifestation of My Twitch Stream.

2016 Hugo nomination
In 2016, Tingle's Space Raptor Butt Invasion was a finalist for the Hugo Award for Best Short Story in the prestigious Hugo Awards for science fiction. This stemmed from a voting campaign by the alt-right "Rabid Puppies" group, a faction of the Sad Puppies movement that objects to modern social trends in science fiction. However, Tingle disavowed the campaign, saying via his Twitter account that it was the work of "devils", and that if his book were to win, video game designer and anti-harassment activist Zoë Quinn would accept the award on his behalf. His story did not win, and Tingle subsequently published Pounded in the Butt by My Hugo Award Loss. In 2017 Tingle was a finalist for a second Hugo Award, this time for Best Fan Writer. He did not win, and later published Pounded in the Butt by My Second Hugo Award Nomination.

Mainstream publication

In July 2022, Tor Books signed Tingle to a two-book deal under its Nightfire horror imprint. The books, titled Camp Damascus and Bury Your Gays, are scheduled for release in 2023 and 2024 respectively.

Other projects 
In 2016, Zoë Quinn announced that they were developing an erotic adventure game with the working title Project Tingler, in collaboration with Tingle. The game was finally named "Kickstarted in the Butt: A Chuck Tingle Digital Adventure" and a Kickstarter campaign was started in October 2016 asking for $69,420 to fund the project. The game raised over $85,000 from 2,450 backers weeks later. As of 2023, the game has not been released.

During Donald Trump's presidential campaign, Tingle created the web site TrumpDebateFacts.com, which purported to fact-check various imaginary Trump claims, mostly attempts to hide Trump's supposed non-human origins (such as "I am not a poorly disguised mass of crabs wearing the skin of bloated human"). Tingle also released the book Slammed In The Butt By Domald Tromp's  Attempt To Avoid Accusations Of Plagiarism By Removing All Facts Or Concrete Plans From His Republican National Convention Speech.

In 2017 a group announced DeepTingle, a computerized text prediction and classification system based on a database of Tingle's fiction, providing a means to "foreground and confront the norms embedded in data-driven creativity and productivity assistance tools".

In 2018, a podcast titled Pounded in the Butt By My Own Podcast, based on Tingle's works, debuted in association with the producers of Welcome to Night Vale, a horror-fantasy podcast. Each episode is essentially an audiobook version of one of Tingle's novellas often read by an alum of the Night Vale podcast (including Cecil Baldwin and Mara Wilson). Another podcast, My Friend Chuck, co-hosted by Tingle and writer/comedian McKenzie Goodwin, aired from 2019 to 2020.

In 2022, Tingle purchased the domain governorabbott.com and used it to protest Texas Governor Greg Abbott's policies impacting transgender individuals.

References

External links 
 
 

21st-century American writers
21st-century American non-fiction writers
21st-century American short story writers
21st-century pseudonymous writers
Autistic savants
American erotica writers
American LGBT novelists
American non-fiction writers
American short story writers
American satirists
Internet memes
Living people
LGBT erotica
Writers from Billings, Montana
People with Asperger syndrome
Place of birth missing (living people)
Year of birth missing (living people)
American bisexual writers